Garden Suburb is an area of Oldham, Greater Manchester, England, 1.9 miles to the south of the town centre, contiguous with Hollins, Copster Hill, Hollinwood and Limeside.

History
Prior to 1880, the area now built upon by the Garden Suburb and an adjoining area known as Hollins Green lying under Copster Hill (now part of Copster Park) lay in Chadderton (Detached), which, as its name implies, was a detached area or exclave of Chadderton township.  Boundary changes from 1880 saw the area absorbed into the town of Oldham.

On 7 August 1909 the Garden Suburb, off Hollins Road, was officially opened with the first gala ceremony.

The Suburbs, as they are known, grew out of the garden suburb movement of the south.

The oasis of winding streets with a deliberate country lane feel, gardens, trees, and verges, was intended as an alternative to terrace houses.

Garden Suburb was the idea of Mary Higgs, founder of the Beautiful Oldham Society, who was impressed by Hampstead Garden Suburb in London.

Dame Sarah Lees, the philanthropist and first woman Oldham councillor, sold land near Hollins cheaply and the idea was to build 700 houses as a co-operative limited company, with rents and rates set low, to encourage working men to take them on. But by 1914, only 183 houses were let, and the tenure gradually changed from rents to ownership of around 400 homes.

They were described as light and airy, well built, of artistic appearance, with a kitchen and good range, and a pantry.

Werneth Golf Club
Founded in 1909, this once semi-moorland course has been modified over the last 100 years and now boasts several tree-lined fairways and many added bunkers.

The course is set in 62 acres of land making it one of the smallest 18 hole courses in acreage in the North West. The club house is on Green Lane adjoining the course.

Transport
First Greater Manchester provides the following bus services along Hollins Road:

180 providing services to Greenfield via Oldham and to Manchester via Failsworth.

184 to Huddersfield via Oldham and Uppermill and to Manchester via Failsworth.

Stagecoach Manchester provides service 76 to Oldham and to Manchester via Limeside and Newton Heath.

References

Chadderton
Areas of Oldham